is a railway station in Aoi-ku, Shizuoka, Shizuoka Prefecture, Japan, operated by the private railway company, Shizuoka Railway (Shizutetsu).

Lines
Furushō Station is a  station on the Shizuoka–Shimizu Line and is 3.8 kilometers from the starting point of the line at Shin-Shizuoka Station.

Station layout
The station has two opposed side platforms, with a level crossing at one end. The station building, located at the west side of the outbound platform, has automated ticket machines, and automated turnstiles, which accept the LuLuCa smart card ticketing system as well as the PiTaPa and ICOCA IC cards. The station is not wheelchair accessible.

Platforms

Adjacent stations

Station History
Furushō Station was established on December 9, 1908.

Passenger statistics
In fiscal 2017, the station was used by an average of 1789 passengers daily (boarding passengers only).

Surrounding area
Shizuoka Agricultural High School

See also
 List of railway stations in Japan

References

External links

 Shizuoka Railway official website 

}

Railway stations in Shizuoka Prefecture
Railway stations in Japan opened in 1908
Railway stations in Shizuoka (city)